The Copa Sevilla is a professional tennis tournament played on outdoor clay courts. It is part of the Association of Tennis Professionals (ATP) Challenger Tour since 1991. It is held annually at the Real Club de Tenis Betis in Seville, Spain since 1963.

Past finals

Key

Singles

Doubles

References

External links
Official website
ITF search

 
ATP Challenger Tour
Clay court tennis tournaments
Tennis tournaments in Spain
Sport in Seville